Cynoponticus is a small genus of eels found throughout the Indo-Pacific. It is one of four genera in the family Muraenesocidae. It currently has three described species, which were formerly in the genus Muraenesox. Members are found in a wide distribution of the Atlantic Ocean,  Pacific and Indian Oceans. They may be found in the west part of the Mediterranean Sea as well. They are nonguarders of their young.

Species
 Cynoponticus coniceps (D. S. Jordan & C. H. Gilbert, 1882) (Red pike conger)
 Cynoponticus ferox O. G. Costa, 1846 (Guinean pike conger)
 Cynoponticus savanna (Bancroft, 1831) (Guayana pike conger)

References

Congridae. p. 156-167. In J.C. Quero, J.C. Hureau, C. Karrer, A. Post and L. Saldanha (eds.) Check-list of the fishes of the eastern tropical Atlantic (CLOFETA). JNICT, Lisbon; SEI, Paris; and UNESCO, Paris. Vol. 1 (Ref. 4453)

Muraenesocidae
Ray-finned fish genera
Taxa named by Oronzio Gabriele Costa